Liverpool St Helens Football Club is an English rugby union team formed from the merger of Liverpool Football Club and St. Helens RUFC.

The institution is not to be confused with either Liverpool F.C. (playing association football) or St. Helens (playing rugby league).

History
The club's first match took place in 1857 when old boys from Rugby school challenged local boys to a game under their school rules. Liverpool Football Club were then formed, the oldest open rugby club in the world.

In 1871, the club provided four of the England team that played Scotland in the first rugby international. On 5 February 1877 another Liverpool player, Edward Kewley, was captain of England when they played Ireland in what was the first 15-a-side international. In 1914 the club had three international captains in the first XV, Ronnie Poulton-Palmer (England), F.H. Turner (Scotland) and R.A. Lloyd (Ireland). Other internationals to play for Liverpool include Fran Cotton, Maurice Colclough, Mike Slemen and Kevin Simms.

St Helens RUFC was founded in 1919 as St Helens Old Boys, the original membership being predominantly made up of former pupils of Cowley School. Internationals who played for the club include Alan 'Ned' Ashcroft, John Horton, Nigel Heslop and the current club President Ray French.

Liverpool and St Helens merged in 1986 and played at Moss Lane which had been the St Helens club's ground. In the early years of the merger the club had two seasons in National Division One split by one season in Division Two. During this time internationals Dewi Morris and Simon Mason played for Liverpool St Helens. But afterwards it sank to Division Four and spent virtually the whole of the 1990s coming to terms with the professional era.

Club Honours
Lancashire Cup winners (5): 1977, 1979, 1984, 1990, 1996
North Division 2 West champions: 2006-07

Former Internationals from Liverpool St Helens F.C.

''Source for below:

 John Clayton 1871
 Arthur Lyon 1871
 Frank Tobin 1871
 Edward Kewley 1874
 Hon. Sidney Parker 1874
 J. R. Hay Gordon 1875
 C. W. H. Clark 1875
 C. L. Verelst  1876
 Charles Touzel  1877
 Henry Springmann  1879
 Harold Dingwall Bateson   1879
 Arthur Kemble 1885
G. G. Allen 1897
 W. B. Stoddart  1897
 R. Pierce   1898
 W. Mortimer 1899
 C. E. Allen  1900
 John Strand-Jones  1902
 Reginald Spooner 1903
H. J. Knox  1904
 L. A. N. Slocock  1907
 G. Leather  1907
 G. Pinion  1909
 M. G. Garry  1909
 Ronald Poulton-Palmer  1909
 A. W. Angus  1910
 R. A. Lloyd  1910
 Edward O'Donovan Crean, 1910 
 F. H. Turner 1911
 Arthur Blakiston 1920
 E. J. Massey 1925
 Watcyn Thomas 1927
 H. A. Fry 1933
 A. A. Brown 1938
 M. Regan 1953
 R. Higgins 1954
 A. Ashcroft 1956
 K. R. F. Bearne 1960
 R. J. French 1961
 T. J. Brophy 1964
 E. L. Rudd 1965
 F. E. Cotton 1971
 M. C. Beese 1972
 D. Roughley 1973
 M. A. C. Slemen 1976
 J. P. Horton 1978
 M. J. Colclough 1982
C. Jones 1983
 K. G. Simms 1985
 C. D. Morris  1988
 N. J. Heslop 1990
 S. G. Mason  1996
 N. Tchakoute  2001
 J. Keulemans  2001
 BJ Botha  2006

References

External links
Official site

Premiership Rugby teams
Rugby clubs established in 1857
Sport in St Helens, Merseyside
English rugby union teams
1857 establishments in England